Ketlen Souza (born August 18, 1995) is a Brazilian mixed martial artist (MMA) who currently competes in Invicta Fighting Championships in the flyweight division, where she is the current Invicta FC Flyweight Champion.

Mixed martial arts career

Early career 
Souza started her professional MMA career in 2016 and mainy fought in Brazil. She amassed a record of 11–3 prior to being signed by Invicta.

In her last fight before Invicta, Souza defeated Gisele Moreira via unanimous decision for the SFT Women's Bantamweight Championship at SFT 28 on August 5, 2021.

Invicta Fighting Championships
Souza was scheduled to challenge the reigning Invicta FC Flyweight Champion Karina Rodríguez at Invicta FC 46. However, Souza withdrew from the bout four days before the event and was replaced by Daiana Torquato.

Souza made her Invicta debut on September 28, 2022, at Invicta FC 49 against Maiju Suotama. She won the fight via unanimous decision.

Souza was booked to challenge Kristina Williams for the vacant Invicta FC Flyweight Championship at Invicta FC 51 on January 18, 2023. She won the fight via unanimous decision.

Championships and accomplishments

Mixed martial arts 
 Invicta Fighting Championships
 Invicta FC Flyweight Championship (One time, current)
Standout Fighting Tournament
SFT Women's Bantamweight Championship (One time)

Mixed martial arts record

|-
| Win
| align=center| 13–3
| Kristina Williams
| Decision (unanimous)
| Invicta FC 51: Tennant vs. Bernardo
| 
| align=center|5
| align=center|5:00
| Denver, Colorado, United States
| 
|-
| Win
| align=center| 12–3
| Maiju Suotama
| Decision (unanimous)
| Invicta FC 49: Delboni vs. DeCoursey
| 
| align=center| 3
| align=center| 5:00
| Hinton, Oklahoma, United States
| 
|-
| Win
| align=center| 11–3
| Gisele Moreira
| Decision (unanimous)
| SFT 28: Mexicano vs. Matsumoto
| 
| align=center| 5
| align=center| 5:00
| São Paulo, Brazil
| 
|-
| Win
| align=center| 10–3
| Joane Milen
| TKO (punches)
| Star Combat 1
| 
| align=center| 2
| align=center| 2:03
| Manaus, Brazil
| 
|-
| Win
| align=center| 9–3
| Erianny Castaneda
| TKO (retirement)
| Silva Combat Fight 3
| 
| align=center| 2
| align=center| 5:00
| Manaus, Brazil
| 
|-
| Loss
| align=center| 8–3
| Dayane de Souza Cardoso
| KO (punches)
| Mr. Cage 42
| 
| align=center| 1
| align=center| 1:20
| Manaus, Brazil
| 
|-
|Loss
|align=center| 8–2
|Ariane Carnelossi
|TKO (body kick)
|Future FC 5
|
|align=center|3
|align=center|3:53
|São Paulo, Brazil
| 
|-
| Win
| align=center| 8–1
| Jessica Luanna
| TKO (punches)
| Mr. Cage vs. Rei da Selva Combat 1
| 
| align=center| 2
| align=center| 2:24
| Manaus, Brazil
| 
|-
| Win
| align=center| 7–1
| Erilene Rayla Nascimento
| TKO (punches)
| Mr. Cage 35
| 
| align=center| 5
| align=center| 2:40
| Manaus, Brazil
| 
|-
| Loss
| align=center| 6–1
| Fabiulane Melo
| Submission (armbar)
| Coari Champions
| 
| align=center| 1
| align=center| 1:56
| Coari, Brazil
| 
|-
| Win
| align=center| 6–0
| Andréia Cerdeira
| Submission (rear-naked choke)
| Mr. Cage 34
| 
| align=center| 2
| align=center| 2:50
| Manaus, Brazil
| 
|-
| Win
| align=center| 5–0
| Paula Lira Pontes
| TKO (punches)
| Back Fish MMA 2
| 
| align=center| 1
| align=center| 2:55
| Manaus, Brazil
| 
|-
| Win
| align=center| 4–0
| Davina Maciel
| TKO (punches)
| Mr. Cage 29
| 
| align=center| 1
| align=center| 0:59
| Manaus, Brazil
|
|-
| Win
| align=center| 3–0
| Jamily Solarth
| TKO (punches)
| Luta Tribal 1 
| 
| align=center| 1
| align=center| 1:36
| Manaus, Brazil
|
|-
| Win
| align=center| 2–0
| Erilene Rayla Nascimento
| Decision (unanimous)
| Jovem Pan Fight Night 1
| 
| align=center| 3
| align=center| 5:00
| Manaus, Brazil
|
|-
| Win
| align=center| 1–0
| Roberta Camila Rocha
| TKO (punches)
| Arena Fight Championship 2
| 
| align=center| 1
| align=center| 4:00
| Coari, Brazil
|
|-

See also
List of current Invicta FC fighters
List of female mixed martial artists

References

External links
 

1995 births
Living people
People from Manaus
Flyweight mixed martial artists
Mixed martial artists utilizing Luta Livre
Brazilian female mixed martial artists